The Lotus Caves is a juvenile science fiction novel by John Christopher, first published in 1969.

It is clearly inspired by the Lotus-eaters of Greek Mythology.

Plot synopsis
Two teenage boys, Marty and Steve, live in a colony on the Moon, "The Bubble", in the year 2068. Exploring outside the dome of "The Bubble" is strictly controlled. The boys grow bored and decide to borrow a lunar vehicle. They discover someone has forgotten to remove their key, which makes it possible for them to explore beyond proscribed boundaries without restriction. They go on a journey to an old and abandoned base, where they find the diary of Andrew Thurgood, a missing early lunar settler. The diary contains coordinates to a place Thurgood claimed he saw something that looked like a huge flower, and the boys decide to go there and do some investigating themselves. They crash through the Moon's surface into a series of caverns containing fluorescent plants, many of them able to move, which is a part of and controlled by a single intelligent alien life form. They also meet a man, the missing settler from 70 years earlier, who has become enthralled by the alien. He does not seem to have aged during all those years.  The boys are torn between staying in the caves, within which the alien provides an idyllic life fulfilling all their needs, and escaping. The longer they stay, the more their minds are affected. They eventually escape, but the man decides to stay, having lost any desires beyond worshipping the alien.

Theme
The novel's main theme is that of the development of a young person's will and independence, and the conflict between benevolent authority and individual conscience.

Adaptations

Film 
A film adaptation of the book was in development in 2007, from Walden Media, to be written by Brian Klugman and Lee Sternthal and directed by Rpin Suwannath.

Television 
In 2010, the US television network Syfy ordered a pilot episode based on the story. They finally commissioned a series in 2012. The series was called High Moon. Principal photography for the pilot began on August 26, 2013, in Vancouver. The episode was directed by Adam Kane and was written by Jim Gray from an adaptation by Bryan Fuller and Gray.

Syfy ultimately passed on the series, but the pilot was released as a TV movie and aired on September 15, 2014.

See also

 The Moon in fiction

References

External links

1969 British novels
1969 science fiction novels
2068
Fiction set in the 2060s
Novels set on the Moon
Children's science fiction novels
British science fiction novels
Works published under a pseudonym
Novels by John Christopher
Hamish Hamilton books